The British Non-Ferrous Metals Research Association was a research group in the United Kingdom during the 20th century, bringing together public and privately funded research into metallurgy. The name was abbreviated officially to B.N.F.M.R.A. (the organisation was normally known as ‘The BNF’ during its life).  It was formed in 1920 by members of the British Non-Ferrous Metals Federation which represented the commercial interests of British manufacturers of coppers and copper alloys, lead, zinc and other non-ferrous metals and their alloys, latterly including titanium.  Robert Hutton was appointed director in 1921.

Membership
The 600 or so subscribing members formed Industry Committees representing each of the main metal interests which discussed and agreed the topics for technical work to be done and a Council that controlled overall finances.  Initially there was an annual government grant towards the work but this was changed to support funding for individual projects.  When topics for research were agreed and funded by the industry they were then submitted to the government for approval of matching support funding but after the 1960s policy dictated that this became more and more difficult to obtain.  The BNF also took on some contracts wholly sponsored by organisations which included some government departments.  Individual technical enquiries from members were answered on a free and confidential basis.

Laboratories

For many years after the new art deco fronted building was opened in 1939 the work was carried out in laboratories fronting on Euston Street, London, NW1.  These included three parallel four-story blocks of laboratories and offices with the basements being used for the heaviest equipment and for storage of samples. The Euston Street building was extended to the right of the main entrance making the address 81–103 Euston Street, with the laboratories behind being in Regnart Buildings and Euston Buildings which fronted on Stephenson Way. The extension was opened on 13 May 1959 by Sir Alexander Fleck.  In the mid-1950s the Duke of Edinburgh toured all departments. 

The laboratories were grouped in specialist sections, including analytical chemistry, corrosion, creep testing, electroplating, fatigue testing, general metallurgy, information library, mechanical testing, melting and casting, members liaison, metallography, metal working, physics (X-ray crystallography), and spectrography. 

The laboratories were an excellent training ground both for assistants who studied for their qualifications part-time and for recent graduates from universities.  As such members found that staff could be ideal recruits for industrial work.  There were 150–200 staff and the average time for researchers to stay was about three years and they could then be found in industries in Britain and worldwide. From the late 1930s to the 1960s through the war and then post-war recovery the Director was Mr G. L. Bailey with Miss E. M. (Helen) Hills as his secretary.

Reports
There was a quarterly report on each research topic presented to the individual research committee and an annual one circulated also to members on request. Final results were compiled as a report that was immediately available to members.  After about two years the commercial confidentiality was dropped and a paper was presented at a meeting of the Institute of Metals or other organisation and subsequently published in their Journal.  Some researches that had resulted in valuable definitive advancements were then published in book form.

Wartime work
Much of the work done by the BNF during the 1939–45 period was of vital use for the defence industry.  This especially included solving many of the corrosion problems of seawater cooled condenser tubes and tube plates that had resulted in many ships being unserviceable and significant improvements in corrosion resistant alloys for seawater pumps and pipe fittings.  No work was ever carried out on active materials for nuclear weapons.  Some consultancy work was undertaken on paperwork for new designs.

There has been much publicity about Melita Norwood  (née Sirnis) who joined the BNF in 1932 as a clerk, was eventually promoted to secretary and retired 1972.  As secretary to a Research Superintendent she had access to the papers prepared at the BNF for presentation to the research committees and some contractors.  Some of these she chose to copy to Russian intelligence. This information was made use of by them and did occasionally result in one of their research organisations publishing development work on non-ferrous metals similar to and sooner than the BNF in Britain.

BNF-Fulmer
During the 1970s the BNF became the BNF Metals Technology Centre and moved out of London to Grove Laboratories, Denchworth Road, Wantage, Oxfordshire.  Recognising globalisation, membership was then opened to companies based overseas.  In 1990 the BNF bought Fulmer Research Laboratories from the Institute of Physics and was renamed the BNF-Fulmer, then BNF (Fulmer Materials Centre).  The laboratories were closed in 1992.

References

 BNFMRA ‘Ten years of research for the metal industries: A brief record of progress made by the British Non-Ferrous Metals Research Association, 1920-1930’, 1931
 BNFMRA ‘A Brief Illustrated Description of the Headquarters and Central Laboratories, Regnart Street and Euston Street, London N.W.1, 1931.'
 BNFMRA ‘The Laboratories Of The British Non-Ferrous Metals Research Association’, 1939
 Sir John Greenly ‘British Non-Ferrous Metals Research Association: 1920-1945’, 1945.
 BNFMRA ‘British Non-Ferrous Metals Research Association 1962’. (Annual Reports were issued each year).
 S.L. Archbutt and W. E. Prythurch ‘Effect of Impurities in Copper’, 1937, BNFMRA
 S. J. Nightingale, ‘Tin Solders: a modern study of the properties of tin solders and soldered joints, BNFMF Research Monographs. No. 1, 1932,  second edition 1942.
 D. M. Smith, ‘Metallurgical Analysis by the Spectrograph, BNFMF Research Monographs No. 2, 1933
 R Genders and G.L. Bailey ‘The Casting of Brass Ingots’, 1934, reprinted 1943, BNFMRA.

External links
British Non-Ferrous Metals Research Association and BNFMRA at the National Archives
Old Copper - British Non-Ferrous Metals Research Association plans and photos

Research and development organizations
British research associations
1920 establishments in the United Kingdom
Scientific organizations established in 1920
1992 disestablishments in the United Kingdom
Metallurgical industry of the United Kingdom
Metallurgical organizations
Organisations based in the London Borough of Camden
Research institutes in Oxfordshire
Organizations disestablished in 1992
Vale of White Horse